Trichonta is a genus of flies belonging to the family Mycetophilidae.

The genus has almost cosmopolitan distribution.

Species:
T. aberrans  
T. aberransida  
†T. brachycamptoides  (Priabonian, Baltic Amber)
†T. crassipes  (Priabonian, Baltic Amber)
†T. dawsoni  (Eocene?, Quesnel)

References

Mycetophilidae